The Waikawa River flows east then south through the Catlins, an area of the southern South Island of New Zealand. Close to its mouth, it cascades over a small series of cataracts, ironically named Niagara Falls.

References

Rivers of Southland, New Zealand
Rivers of New Zealand